Maggie O'Sullivan (born 1951) is a British poet, performer and visual artist associated with the British Poetry Revival.

Life
O'Sullivan was born in Lincoln, England of Irish immigrant parents. She moved to London in 1971 and worked for the BBC until 1988. Her early work appeared in magazines such as Angel Exhaust. She lives in Hebden Bridge, West Yorkshire.

O'Sullivan's work is influenced by Kurt Schwitters, Joseph Beuys, Jerome Rothenberg, Bob Cobbing and Basil Bunting. Her books include An Incomplete Natural History (1984), In the House of the Shaman (1993), Red Shifts (2000) and Palace of Reptiles (2003). She edited out of everywhere: An anthology of contemporary linguistically innovative poetry by women in North America & the UK (1996).

References

External links
Maggie O'Sullivan's website
An essay on O'Sullivan
Review of Palace of Reptiles

1951 births
Living people
English women poets
Modernist women writers
British Poetry Revival
People from Hebden Bridge
21st-century English women writers
21st-century British writers